Dasia (lizard) is a genus of skink
 Dasia also refers to dasia pneumata, plural of dasy pneuma or rough breathing, a diacritic mark used in the Polytonic Greek and Early Cyrillic alphabets